Hupari is a Municipal council in Kolhapur district in the Indian state of Maharashtra. Hupari comes under Hatkanangle taluka.

Hupari is famous for the production of silver ornaments. Most of the families in this city have ancestral skill for developing artistic ornaments from silver. There is big temple of Shri aai ambabai mata (Mahalaxmi temple)

Demographics
 India census, Hupari had a population of 28,229. Males constitute 51% of the population and females 49%. Hupari has an average literacy rate of 70%, higher than the national average of 59.5%: male literacy is 76%, and female literacy is 62%. In Hupari, 12% of the population is under 6 years of age.

References

Cities and towns in Kolhapur district